Vortex Records was a jazz subsidiary of Atlantic Records that released 14 albums between 1968 and 1970, including the debut albums by Keith Jarrett, Chick Corea, and Sonny Sharrock.

Discography

References

Jazz record labels
American record labels
Atlantic Records